Sonora State Highway 176 (Carretera Estatal 176) is a highway in the south of the Mexican state of Sonora.

It runs from Huatabampo to the junction with Mexican Federal Highway 15.

References

176